Lee Goren (born December 26, 1977) is a Canadian former professional ice hockey right winger who played in the National Hockey League (NHL) with the Boston Bruins, Florida Panthers and the Vancouver Canucks before playing the remainder of his career abroad in Europe.

Goren was drafted in the third round, 63rd overall by the Boston Bruins in the 1997 NHL Entry Draft. During his collegiate career with the University of North Dakota, he won an NCAA championship. He ended his career in the 2012-13 with Linköpings HC of the then Swedish Elitserien.

Career statistics

Awards and honors

References

External links

1977 births
Living people
Boston Bruins draft picks
Boston Bruins players
Canadian ice hockey right wingers
EV Zug players
Färjestad BK players
Florida Panthers players
Linköping HC players
Manitoba Moose players
Lahti Pelicans players
Providence Bruins players
San Antonio Rampage players
Saskatoon Blades players
SC Bern players
Skellefteå AIK players
Ice hockey people from Winnipeg
Straubing Tigers players
Tappara players
North Dakota Fighting Hawks men's ice hockey players
Vancouver Canucks players
Canadian expatriate ice hockey players in Finland
Canadian expatriate ice hockey players in Germany
Canadian expatriate ice hockey players in Switzerland
Canadian expatriate ice hockey players in Sweden
AHCA Division I men's ice hockey All-Americans
NCAA men's ice hockey national champions